Simon Lichtenberg (born 15 December 1997) is a German former professional snooker player.

Career
Lichtenberg was the German amateur champion in 2016 and won the EBSA European Under-21 Snooker Championships in 2018. With this win he was awarded a two-year card for the professional snooker tour from the 2018–19 season onwards.

He lost his tour card at the end of the 2020 season after failing to make the top 64, but he regained it in the first Q School event by beating Leo Fernandez 4–1 in the final.

Performance and rankings timeline

Career finals

Amateur finals: 11 (7 titles)

References

External links

Simon Lichtenberg at worldsnooker.com

1997 births
Living people
German snooker players
Sportspeople from Berlin